Blue Girl Beer is a German beer brand founded in the 19th century. It is currently brewed in South Korea.

History 
Blue Girl Beer was first brewed in Bremen in the 19th century. In 1906, Blue Girl Beer was acquired by Jebsen & Co. and was introduced into Hong Kong. Nowadays, it is one of the most popular beers in Hong Kong with a market share of 20% in Hong Kong's beer industry.

Ingredients 
The main ingredients of Blue Girl Beer are water, malt, hops, yeast and adjuncts.

See also 
 Beer in Hong Kong

References 

Beer brands of Germany